The 2005 Lake Tanganyika earthquake occurred at  on 5 December with a moment magnitude of 6.8 and a maximum Mercalli intensity of X (Extreme).

Early reports indicated that the heaviest damage was sustained by the eastern provinces of the Democratic Republic of the Congo (DRC), a region already ravaged by extensive war and extreme poverty. The area houses tens of thousands of refugees displaced by conflicts, such as the Second Congo War and the Burundian Civil War, that have plagued the African Great Lakes in the 1990s and 2000s.

Dozens of houses collapsed in the DRC city of Kalemie. A UN spokesman said that most of the casualties were caused by falling zinc or steel roofs.

Depending on several factors including soil types, prevalent construction techniques and the acceleration from the earthquake itself, earthquakes with magnitudes in the 6–7 range may or may not cause wide spread damage. In East Africa such seismic events can wreak havoc. The quake was centred roughly below Lake Tanganyika and – in addition to the DRC, where the most widespread damage has been reported – it was felt in Burundi, Tanzania, Rwanda, and as far away as Mombasa, Kenya, and Luanda, Angola.

References

External links
M 6.8 - Lake Tanganyika region, Dem. Republic of the Congo-Tanzania – United States Geological Survey
Earthquake in Eastern Africa – NASA Earth Observatory
Magnitude 6.8 quake kills at least 2 in Congo – NBC News

2005 disasters in Africa
Lake Tanganyika earthquake
Lake Tanganyika earthquake
Earthquakes in the Democratic Republic of the Congo
Lake Tanganyika earthquake, 2005